The Kimball Yard is a CTA rail yard in the Albany Park neighborhood on the Northwest side of Chicago, Illinois which stores cars for the Brown Line of the Chicago Transit Authority. Currently, 2600-series and 3200-series  railcars are stored here. It is adjacent to Kimball station.

References 

Chicago Transit Authority